Artyom Valerievich Zub (given name alternately spelled Artem; born 3 October 1995) is a Russian professional ice hockey defenceman for the Ottawa Senators of the National Hockey League (NHL).

Playing career
Zub played as a youth with Amurskie Tigry Khabarovsk, the junior affiliate to Amur Khabarovsk. He made his professional debut with Amur Khabarovsk in the Kontinental Hockey League during the 2014–15 season.

During the 2016–17 season, his third with Khabarovsk, Zub contributed with 9 points in 32 games before he was traded to a powerhouse club SKA Saint Petersburg on 1 December 2016. Zub maintained a regular role on the SKA blueline to close out the season. In the post-season, he helped the club claim the Gagarin Cup with 2 assists in 18 games.

Zub's play in the KHL and the Olympics attracted the attention of the National Hockey League (NHL)'s Ottawa Senators. On 1 May 2020, the Senators signed him to an NHL-standard entry-level contract as an undrafted free agent for one season. He scored his first NHL goal in a 6–5 overtime win against the Toronto Maple Leafs on 15 February 2021 at the Scotiabank Arena in Toronto. In his first season, he was regularly paired on defence with Ottawa's top defenceman Thomas Chabot.

On 14 May 2021, Zub signed a two-year, $5 million extension with the Senators. The fans in attendance at the Canadian Tire Centre have taken to Zub, and now yell "Zuub" when he plays the puck. Zub, due to his limited English had to be reassured by his teammates that he was not being booed, now enjoys it.

On 21 December 2022, Zub was signed to a four-year, $18.4 million extension by the Senators.

International play

He played for the Russian national team  at the 2017 IIHF World Championship. He is a member of the Gold medal winning Olympic Athletes from Russia team at the 2018 Winter Olympics.

Career statistics

Regular season and playoffs

International

Awards and honors

References

External links

 

1995 births
Living people
Amur Khabarovsk players
Amurskie Tigry players
Ice hockey players at the 2018 Winter Olympics
Medalists at the 2018 Winter Olympics
Olympic gold medalists for Olympic Athletes from Russia
Olympic ice hockey players of Russia
Olympic medalists in ice hockey
Ottawa Senators players
Russian ice hockey defencemen
SKA Saint Petersburg players
Sportspeople from Khabarovsk
Undrafted National Hockey League players